Jill Jackson is the name of:
Jill Jackson (Paul & Paula) (born 1942), half of American pop duo Paul & Paula
Jill Jackson (singer) (born 1979), Scottish singer-songwriter and ex-frontwoman for Speedway (band)
 Jill Jackson (pageant contestant), Miss Indiana 1969